The following is a general comparison of OTP applications that are used to generate one-time passwords for two-factor authentication (2FA) systems using the time-based one-time password (TOTP) or the HMAC-based one-time password (HOTP) algorithms.

Authenticated implementations

See also
 Password manager
 List of password managers

References 

Computer access control
Authentication methods
Password authentication